Winners of the Pole position for the Indianapolis 500. The pole position is the first starting position on the grid, situated on the inside of the front row, and is held in high prestige at Indianapolis. Due to the nature of qualifying for the Indianapolis 500, the pole-sitter is currently determined seven days before the race (and in past years as many as 15 days prior). As a result, the pole-winning driver and team receives considerable pre-race attention and accolades in the days leading up to the race. In most circumstances, but not necessarily, the pole-sitter is the fastest car in the field, and thus one of the pre-race favorites to win the race.

Nippon Telegraph and Telephone currently sponsors a $100,000 award given to the pole winner. Rick Mears holds the all-time record with six career pole positions. Ten drivers have won the pole position in two consecutive years, but no driver has ever won three years in a row. Through 2019, the Indianapolis 500 has been won from the pole position a total of 21 times (out of 103).

Background
Since the first Indianapolis 500 in 1911, all cars have been required to qualify for the race. This had been by means of a speed/time trial out on the race course. Since 1939, the starting grid (including the "pole position") has been determined utilizing four-lap (10-mile) qualification runs. Each qualification run is performed with no other cars on the track. This format differs from traditional road racing and NASCAR qualifying, in which multiple cars are on the track simultaneously in a "group" or "open" qualifying session. It also differs from most other oval races in which qualifying speed is based on a single hot lap. The theory is that each car could give its best performance if there were no other vehicles on the track to impede them.

Ironically in modern times, cars can actually run faster with other cars on the track due to drafting. Nearly every unofficial practice speed record has been achieved by exploiting another car's slipstream, referred to colloquially as receiving a "tow.". Starting roughly around the 1960s, electric eyes, and in the 1980s radar guns, were used to measure trap speeds at select locations, namely at the end of the long straightaways, in an effort to determine the cars' top speeds. Since the early 1990s, sophisticated electronic scoring devices have been installed at the track and inside the cars to measure additional trap speeds (straightaways, turns, etc.). However, the official scoring only reflects the time and speed at the start/finish line. All other measurements are unofficial.

Early years
In 1911, the starting grid was determined by the order that entries were received by mail. To qualify for the race, entries had to average  or faster along a "flying" quarter-mile measured segment of the track. Each cars was given three attempts, and speeds were not recorded - only pass/fail. In 1912, all cars were required to complete one timed lap (2.5 miles) at a minimum speed, but the grid order was still determined by the order the entries were received. For 1913 and 1914, all cars completed one timed lap at a minimum speed. Overseas competitors voiced complaints about their entries arriving in the mail later than local entrants, and thus unfairly starting deep in the grid. A compromise was made such that the grid was determined by a blind draw a few days before the race.

Starting in 1915, for the first time, the grid order was set by qualifying results. Though multiple days were allotted for qualifying (often referred to as "elimination trials"), drivers were known to wait until the last minute to qualify. Even though the track would normally be made available for practice beginning on May 1, many teams chose not to even arrive until just before elimination trials. The Speedway reacted by setting up a slightly retooled format in 1916 such that the first day qualifiers lined up first in the grid by speed. The second day qualifiers would line up behind the first day qualifiers, and so on, regardless if drivers on subsequent days were faster than the first day qualifiers. This encouraged drivers to qualify earlier rather than "last minute."  This general grid alignment rule was used through the 2000s, and (excluding 1911-1914), sixteen times the pole winner was not the overall fastest car in the field.

One-lap qualifying speeds were used for 1915, 1916, and 1919. From 1920 to 1932, the grid was set using four-lap (10-mile) qualifying runs. From 1933 to 1938, the grid was set using ten-lap (25-mile) qualifying runs. In 1939, they reverted to four-lap runs, and that is still in use today.

Nostalgia
The term "pole position" is believed to have derived from horse racing. Despite some common misconception, is not so named from the iconic pylon "pole" scoring tower at the track.

The pole position traditionally (and weather permitting) has been determined on the first day of time trials, nicknamed "Pole Day." The final day of time trials has been nicknamed "Bump Day" or "Bubble Day." When the field is filled to 33 cars, the slowest car in the field is said to be "on the bubble." Additional drivers may attempt to qualify faster and bump their way into the field. The driver is said to have 'bust the other driver's bubble.' Since 2014, the use of these two terms has diminished due to a revamped qualifying format (see below).

Schedule
Pole position qualifying, generally referred to as "Pole Day," is currently held the weekend prior to the race. Two days of qualifying are scheduled in total, the Saturday and Sunday before the race. Since 2010, the pole winner has been determined by a special "shootout" session amongst the nine fastest qualifiers.

Springtime rain in the midwest is often a factor, and over the years, many days of qualifying have been delayed, ended early, or completely washed out due to rain. If pole day is rained out, it is moved to the next qualifying day scheduled. This happened most recently in 2006 and 2015. In 2006 (when four days were scheduled), the first two days of qualifying were rained out and pole position qualifying ended up being held on the third day, followed by what remained the fourth and final day. In 2015 (when two days were scheduled), the first day of time trials was washed out, and all time trials was held on the second and final day.

In the years when there were four days of time trials, if the second or third day of qualifying were to be rained out, neither would be made up (for example, this happened in 1980). If the final day of time trials ("Bump Day") was rained out, it would not be made up if the field had already filled to 33 cars (for example, this happened in 1984). If Bump Day were to be rained out, and the field was not filled to 33 cars yet, a special session would be held Monday (to date, this has occurred only once, in 1968).

Pre-war years
The schedule for time trials (referred to at the time as "elimination trials") varied over the years. The number of days varied from three to as many as eight. In many cases, qualifying began the Saturday-Sunday before the race, and continued through the week for a few days, and ended usually two days before the race. The day before the race would be normally reserved for track cleaning, and final "carburation tests." It was standard procedure for qualifying to generally run each day until sundown.

1952–1997
After WWII, the Speedway management began to standardize the qualifying schedule. For a few years, six days (three weekends) of qualifying were held. Starting in 1952, it was reduced to four days (two weekends). The pole position would be settled on the first day, now nicknamed "Pole Day." In addition, the closing time for the track was eventually set at 6:00 p.m. local time. In previous decades, the track generally closed at sundown.

In 1974 only, as a gesture to the ongoing energy crisis, qualifying was reduced to two days – the Saturday two weeks before the race, and the Saturday one week before the race. Both of those two days were divided into two sessions (an "early" period and a "late" period) mimicking the traditional four 'days.' Rain hampered both days, however, and the "four periods" plan was rendered incomplete. The two-day schedule lasted only one year, and in 1975, the Speedway went back to four days.

Since the race itself was not fixed on the weekend until the early 1970s, it was not uncommon prior to then for the final weekend of time trials to occur only a couple days before the race itself (if Memorial Day fell on a weekday early in the week).

1998–2000
From 1998 to 2000, an experimental two-week "compressed" schedule was adopted for the Indy 500. Time trials was reduced to only two days of qualifying, the Saturday & Sunday one weekend before the race. "Pole day" would be held Saturday, and "Bump day" would be held Sunday. This was an effort to reduce costs, and maximize crowds. The middle two days of qualifying had long suffered from dwindling attendance, participation, and interest.

2001–2004
From 2001 to 2004, the schedule was expanded to three days of qualifying, the Saturday and Sunday two weekends before the race, and the Sunday one week before the race. The additional day allowed make-up time in case of rain, and stretched the month back to the traditional three weekends.

The Saturday immediately before Bump Day was reverted to a regular practice day, and for a short time, the Freedom 100 was scheduled for that afternoon. The arrangement received mixed reviews, and was eventually scrapped.

2005–2009
Time trials reverted to four days (two weekends). The procedure also changed, with the first three days only offering the fastest 11 cars on each qualifying day a starting position. The Freedom 100, which was on the second Saturday, was moved permanently to Carb Day later in the month.

2010–present
The Speedway reinstated the two-week "compressed" schedule, similar to the plan used in 1998–2000. Time trials is scheduled for two days: the Saturday & Sunday one weekend before the race. From 2010 through 2013, "Pole Day" is held Saturday, and "Bump Day" is held Sunday. The track opens for practice the weekend before time trials.

Starting in 2014, with the addition of the road course race on the first weekend, oval practice is reduced, and the two-day qualifying schedule was kept intact, but the procedure was changed such that the pole position winner is not actually determined until Sunday.

Qualifying procedure
On a given day of qualifying, the track is open for qualifications from 11 a.m. (or 12 noon) to 5 p.m. local time. If there are no cars in line to make an attempt, the track is opened for general practice, or (briefly) closed for routine safety inspection. The busiest periods of qualifying, due to ambient and track temperatures, are the first hour and the final hour. Due to the lower temperatures and shadows cast along the track it is common for drivers to wait until late in the day to make their attempts. The car must be moving out of the pits before the clock reaches zero for the attempt to count.

Each driver is allowed two warm-up laps before taking the green flag to start the run. Prior to WWII, it is believed that drivers were generally allowed an unlimited number of warm up laps, and could start their run whenever they deemed themselves ready. From 1946 through 1981, drivers were allowed three warm up laps. In 1982, it was reduced to two warm-up laps, however, INDYCAR and Bridgestone Tire officials have thermometers that can display track surface temperatures, and if they determine track temperatures are below a certain threshold, a third lap can be added to build sufficient tire temperatures.

As the driver is coming around to start the qualifying attempt, a crew member(s) is stationed at the head of the main stretch and waves a green flag to signify they want to start the run. If he waves a yellow flag, or waves no flag, the run does not start, and an attempt is not counted. At any time prior to completing the four-lap run, the crew can "wave off" the run by holding up the yellow flag. Likewise the driver can pull off the track at any time to abort the run. Prior to 1974, the decision to start the run was actually made by the driver, who would signal the officials by raising his hand in the air. For safety purposes, due to increasing speeds, the increasingly tight confines of the cockpits, and the fact that crews are now in constant contact with drivers through two-radio communication, the hand signals were eliminated.

Procedure (through 2004)
During the USAC era, the traditional qualifying procedure went largely unchanged although it may appear complicated to the casual observer. Pole day was considered the most significant, popular, and busiest of the speed trial period, while the other three days were more often leisurely and sometimes uneventful. The evening before pole day time trials, a blind draw is used to establish the qualifying order. Prior to 1965, no draw was used, and the qualifying order was a "first-come, first-served" line-up, queued down the pit lane and usually stretching into the garage area. Some teams would even claim their spots in line the night before. The unorganized scramble to roll the cars into a queue had often led to heated exchanges, collisions, and unfair situations. In 1971, the rules were further clarified to guarantee every car in the original qualifying draw at least one attempt to qualify in the pole position round, regardless if weather or other circumstances interfered.

One at a time, cars ran a four-lap qualifying attempt to post qualifying speed. Despite the popular commonplace of reporting qualifying speed, officially, the qualifying results are scored by elapsed time. Each car had three attempts to post a qualifying time and whenever the four laps were completed the time was "locked in". During the run, if a driver/team felt their speed was not to their satisfaction, they could wave off that run at any time before completing the fourth lap. The wave off was accomplished either by the driver pulling into the pits, or by a crew member waving a yellow flag, and one attempt would be charged to the car. Each car was allowed three total attempts.

Once the run was completed, the qualifying time was locked-in. If the team decided the locked-in time was insufficient, the car would have to be withdrawn, and could not be re-qualified. Another car would have to be used to make a new attempt. In most cases, teams usually would wait until their car was bumped rather than preemptively withdrawing, as the risk-reward was usually considered high.

The fastest qualifier on Pole day won the pole position. The pole day qualifiers were lined up by speed rank. There was no set number of qualifiers for pole day, and the total widely varied by year - ranging from as few as 11 in 1987 to as many as 33 in 1999 - for a number of factors (e.g., weather conditions, crashes, mechanical problems, injuries, or simply by choice). Cars that qualified on the second day lined up by speed behind the pole day qualifiers, followed by the third day qualifiers, and finally, the fourth day qualifiers, until the field filled to 33. This grid arrangement (based on speed rank on each day) usually dictated that the entire grid would not be arranged by speed from top-to-bottom in exact order. In fact, only one time during this period (1969), did the grid happen to be aligned exactly by speed from 1st to 33rd (and that was aided by the fact that two days of time trials had been rained out). It never occurred when four full days of time trials were observed.

Once the field was filled to 33 cars, bumping would begin. The slowest car in the field, regardless of the day it was qualified, was "on the bubble." If a driver went out and qualified faster, the bubble car would be bumped, and the new qualifier would be added to the field. The bumped car would be removed from the grid, and all cars that were behind him would move up a spot. The new driver would take his position according to his speed rank on the day he qualified (typically the final day). This procedure would be repeated until the track closed at 6 p.m. on the final day of qualifying. Bumped cars could not be re-qualified. A bumped driver would have to secure a back-up car (assuming it had attempts left on it) in order to bump his way back into the field.

11/11/11 (2005–2009)
Starting 2005, although due to rain it was not observed fully until 2007, the qualifying procedure was altered. The 33-car field would be split into three parts.
On the first day of qualifying (pole day)- positions 1–11 would be filled; bumping amongst those 11 cars would occur
On the second day of qualifying- positions 12–22 would be filled; bumping amongst those 11 cars would occur
On the third day of qualifying- positions 23–33 would be filled; bumping amongst those 11 cars would occur
On the fourth day of qualifying (bump day)- bumping begins immediately as the slowest car overall is "on the bubble," in danger of being bumped out by the next qualifier; all cars behind those bumped out are immediately slotted up one position regardless of their day of qualification, but no fourth-day qualifier is slotted ahead of first-, second- or third-day qualifiers still remaining in the field.

This procedure is commonly referred to as "11/11/11" since eleven cars would qualify on each of the first three days. Two other major rule changes were introduced alongside this format. Drivers were now allowed three qualifying attempts in a car per day. Previously each car was only allowed three attempts during the entire month, and once an attempt had been completed, it was locked-in. Cars that were bumped could be re-qualified (provided they still had attempts left), and likewise drivers could withdraw an already-qualified car and re-qualify it (provided it still had attempts left). In both cases, the new rules permitting multiple attempts per day allowed drivers more opportunities to put in their fastest possible speeds. Allowing bumped cars to re-qualify also alleviated the issue regarding the shortage of chassis that had become somewhat problematic during that time.

Speedway management had toyed with the idea going back as far as 1987, and seriously considered it around 1990. It was offered as an idea to generate excitement into the normally sparse second and third qualifying days. It was not adopted until 2005, and after mixed results, was scrapped after 2009.

24/9 with Fast Nine Shootout (2010–2013)
A new format was introduced, adding an element similar to "knockout qualifying" systems used in World Superbike, Formula One, as well as IndyCar road course races. Cash prizes for the front row were increased, and championship points were awarded for qualifying results for all positions.
Pole Day (Saturday) opened at 11:00 am. A total of 24 positions were available to be filled. All cars were permitted to make up to three qualifying attempts, time permitting, until the session closed at 4:00 pm. Bumping began as soon as the field filled to 24 cars.
At 4:00 pm, positions 10-24 were locked in for the day. Positions 1-9 advance to the Fast Nine Shootout.
At 4:30 pm, the Fast Nine Shootout began, and ran until 6:00 pm. Each of the nine cars had their afternoon time erased. Each car was guaranteed at least one attempt during the shootout to re-qualify. Once every car had completed one attempt, time permitting, cars could go out and make up to two additional attempts. Drivers were not required to erase their initial time when making their second and/or third attempt. The shootout determined the pole position as well as starting positions 2-9.
On Bump Day (Sunday), the remaining positions 25-33 were open for any remaining entries. Bumping begins as soon as the field filled to 33 cars. The slowest car in the field, regardless of the day the car qualified, would be on the bubble, except that the nine cars that competed in the second qualifying session for the pole were protected, and could not be bumped.

On two occasions, (2011 and 2013), rain delayed the start of the Fast Nine Shootout session. In each of those cases, the nine participants were allowed only one attempt during the shootout session. In the first year of the Shootout, the order was set based on the afternoon qualifying results. The nine drivers in order of speed (1st to 9th) chose their position in the qualifying line. In subsequent years, the Shootout order was set as the reverse order of the afternoon qualifying results (9th to 1st).

Two-day format (2014–2018)

A new qualifying format was introduced for 2014, commonly known as the "Two-day format". Qualifying was held over two days (Saturday-Sunday), with the pole position winner, as well as the starting lineup, not determined until the second day. The qualifying procedure was as follows:
On the first day of time trials (Saturday), qualifying was scheduled from 11:00 a.m. to 5:50 p.m. All cars entered were allowed up to three attempts. At the end of the day, the fastest 33 cars were locked into the starting field. Starting grid positions, however, were not assigned. The top nine cars from Saturday advanced to the Fast Nine Shootout.
On the second day of time trials (Sunday), the cars that posted times from 10th to 33rd each made one qualifying attempt. The times from Saturday were erased, and the Sunday speeds determined the starting grid.
Also on Sunday, the top nine cars from Saturday participated in the Fast Nine Shootout to determine the pole position as well as starting positions 2-9.

In 2015, due to inclement weather and a major crash during the Sunday morning practice session, qualifying was delayed and retooled. The Fast Nine Shootout was cancelled, and the field was set in one Sunday afternoon session. Each car was given one attempt to qualify, and positions 1–30 were locked in. In the final hour, a 45-minute Last Row Shootout was held to determine positions 31–33.

During this timeframe, the use of the traditional terms "Pole Day" and "Bump Day" were somewhat curtailed. Eventually the term "Bump Day" would be used for Saturday, and "Pole Day" would be used for Sunday, a reverse of the norm.

Two-day format with Last Row Shootout (2019-present)
A modified version of the Two-day format was introduced beginning in 2019. A new television contract with NBC prompted an emphasis on Sunday for time trials, largely to avoid a conflict with the Preakness Stakes. In addition, after popular driver James Hinchcliffe failed to qualify in 2018, calls for changes to the bumping procedure escalated during the offseason.

Qualifying will continue to be held over two days (Saturday-Sunday), but bumping will be moved back to Sunday. Both the pole position round and a new Last Row Shootout will be held Sunday. The most significant procedural change was that cars that qualified 10th (2019-21) or 13th (2022-) to 30th (or 33rd if only 33 cars are entered) would no longer participate in qualifying activities on the second day.

On Saturday, the procedure is as follows:
Qualifying is open from 11:00 a.m. to 5:50 p.m. All cars entered will be guaranteed at least one attempt. Additional attempts are allowed, time/weather permitting.
The fastest set number of qualifying cars will advance to the second qualifying round.
 From 2019-21, it was the first nine positions.
 In 2022, it will be to twelve positions.
Positions 10 (2019-21) or 13 (2022) to 30 will be locked-in, and will not re-qualify.
If more than 33 cars are entered, Positions 31 and lower will be entered into the Last Row Shootout.

On Sunday, time trials concludes as follows:
The Last Row Shootout is held. Entries that finished 31st and lower on Saturday will re-qualify. Times from Saturday will be erased. Starting positions 31–33 will be filled. All other cars from 34th and lower will fail to qualify. In 2019, the participants were given only one attempt. Starting in 2020, if the Last Row Shootout is necessary, teams may make multiple attempts in the 45 minute session.  If only 33 cars are entered and no cars would be bumped, the Last Row Shootout is not used.
Starting in 2022, the second round will feature the top twelve positions from Saturday qualifying.  Times from the first round on Saturday are erased, and cars go on track in reverse order, with twelfth position going first. The top six in time advance to the final round. Positions 7-12 are set and points are awarded based on result.
The final round will determine starting positions 1–9 (2019-21) or 1-6 (2022), including the pole position. Times from previous round(s) will be erased, and cars will have one attempt to re-qualify. Championship points will be awarded based on the results of the final round. The cars take to the track in reverse order, with the slowest advancing car from the previous round going first, and fastest from the previous round going last.

Indianapolis 500 pole-sitters
Sixty-five drivers have qualified for the pole position, one less than the number of race winners.

Notes
 1935: Billy Arnold qualified at 121.687 mph (10-lap qualifying runs) to win the pole position. In post-inspection, it was determined he used too much fuel. Rules allowed drivers to use 3 gallons of fuel maximum for the run, with a margin of error of 1 pint. It was measured that he used  pint over, and he was disqualified. Rex Mays, the second-fastest qualifier, was elevated to the pole position.
 1996: At the conclusion of pole day qualifying, Scott Brayton qualified for the pole-position, Arie Luyendyk qualified second, and Tony Stewart qualified third. Officially it was Brayton's second consecutive Indy pole (1995–1996). One hour and forty-five minutes after qualifying was over, Luyendyk was disqualified for his car being 7 pounds underweight. Stewart was elevated to second position. The following day, Luyendyk qualified with the fastest speed overall, but as a second day qualifier, was required to line up behind the first day qualifiers. Five days later, Brayton was killed in a practice session accident while driving a back-up car. His primary car was taken over by Danny Ongais, but rules required a substitute driver to move to the rear of the field. Thus, Stewart was elevated to the pole position for race day.

 †  Italian-born

Multiple pole positions
Eighteen drivers have qualified for the pole position more than once, accounting for 49 pole positions out of 98 races, 51.02%.

Notes
 * Scott Brayton qualified for the pole position in 1996, but was killed in a practice session accident with a back-up car six days later.  Tony Stewart, the second-place qualifier, subsequently moved onto the pole position, while Brayton's car, thereafter assigned to Danny Ongais to drive, was, by rule in driver-replacement situations, moved to the last starting position.

 †  Italian-born

Consecutive pole position winners
Qualification for the pole-position in consecutive races has been accomplished eleven times; start from the pole position has occurred ten times. No driver has qualified for three consecutive pole positions.

Indianapolis 500 winners who started from the pole position
Nineteen drivers have won the Indianapolis 500-Mile Race from the pole position in twenty-one out of 105 races, 20.00%. There have been two consecutive wins from the pole position on two separate occasions, in years 1922–1923 and 2008–2009, and three consecutive wins once, in years 1979–1981.

Time trials records

Speed records

Note: Arie Luyendyk's record-setting time trials run was conducted on the second day of time trials in 1996. Therefore, due to the rules at the time, he was ineligible for the pole position. He lined up 20th on the starting grid.

General records
Most Time Starting on Front Row
11 - Rick Mears (1978, 1979, 1982, 1983, 1984, 1986, 1987, 1988, 1989, 1990, 1991)
Most Consecutive Time Starting on Front Row
6 - Rick Mears (1986-1991: 1st, 3rd, 1st, 1st, 2nd, 1st)
Three Former Winners on the Front Row
1975 - A. J. Foyt, Gordon Johncock, Bobby Unser
1987 - Mario Andretti, Bobby Rahal, Rick Mears
1988 - Rick Mears, Danny Sullivan, Al Unser
1991 - Rick Mears, A. J. Foyt, Mario Andretti
Most Pole Positions, Owner/Team
18 - Roger Penske (1977, 1978, 1979, 1981, 1982, 1986, 1988, 1989, 1990, 1991, 1994, 2003, 2006, 2007, 2009, 2010, 2012, 2019)
7 - Chip Ganassi Racing (1993, 2002, 2008, 2015, 2017, 2021, 2022)
4 - Al Dean/Dean Van Lines Racing (1960, 1961, 1966, 1967)
3 - J. C. Agajanian (1950, 1962, 1963)
3 - McLaren (1971, 1973, 1976)
3 - A. J. Foyt Enterprises/Gilmore Racing (1974, 1975, 1998)
3 - Team Menard (1995, 1996, 2000)
3 - Ed Carpenter Racing (2013, 2014, 2018)
2 - many teams
Owner/Team qualifying 1st-2nd-3rd
Roger Penske - 1988 (Rick Mears / Danny Sullivan / Al Unser)
Owner/Team qualifying 1st-2nd
Many times; most recent: Penske Racing - 2010 (Hélio Castroneves / Will Power)
Most Cars Qualified on Front Row, All-Time, Owner
45 - Roger Penske (participation ranges 1969-1995, 2001, 2003-2019)
Closest Margin Between Top Two Qualifiers
0.0023 seconds - 2012 (Ryan Briscoe & James Hinchcliffe)
0.01 seconds - 1970 (Al Unser & Johnny Rutherford)
Closest Time Between Top Three Qualifiers
0.0758 seconds - 2016 (James Hinchcliffe, Josef Newgarden, Ryan Hunter-Reay)
Most consistent qualifying laps
0.0049 seconds, Scott Dixon, 2008 (time was later withdrawn)
Lap 1: 39.9677
Lap 2: 39.9700
Lap 3: 39.9705
Lap 4: 39.9656
Pole Position Winner - Race Performance (103 races)
Finished 1st: 21 times
Finished in the top five: 44 times
Finished in the top ten: 58 times
Finished last (33rd): 5 times

Notes

Works cited
Indianapolis 500 Chronicle, copyright 1999, Rick Pope
2006 Indianapolis 500-Mile Race Official Program
Three forgotten Indianapolis ‘500’ trophies

References

Pole-sitters